Pasqual Ferry (sometimes credited as Paschalis, Pascual or Pascal Ferry) is a Spanish comic book artist and penciller.

Biography

Ferry is known in the United States' comic industry for his work on Heroes for Hire (1997), Action Comics (2000) and Adam Strange (2004).

Other titles he has worked on include Plasmer (1993), 2099: World of Tomorrow (1996) and Warlock (1999).

In 2005, he and writer Grant Morrison began work on the Seven Soldiers of Victory limited series Mister Miracle, which introduced a new version of the character. However, for reasons that have not been made known, he was only able to do the first issue.

In mid-2006, Ferry became the new artist on Marvel's Ultimate Fantastic Four with writer Mike Carey.

In 2010 Ferry became the regular artist on Marvel's Thor teamed with writer Matt Fraction.

Bibliography

Comics work includes:

DC

Mr. Miracle #1-2, Seven Soldiers of Victory (with Grant Morrison and Freddie Williams II, 2005–06)
Adam Strange: Planet Heist (pencils, with Andy Diggle and colors by Dave McCaig, 8-issue limited series, 2004–2005)
Tom Strong #26 (2004)
Action Comics #771, 786-788, 792-793, 798, 800, 803-810 (2000–04)

Marvel

Thor (with Matt Fraction, 2010-2012)
Ender's Game: Battle School (with Chris Yost, 2008–2009)
Ultimate Iron Man II #1-5 (2008)
Ultimate Fantastic Four #33-38, 42-46 (2006–07)
Ultimate X-Men vs Fantastic Four #1-2 (2006)
Young Avengers Special #1 (2006)
New Avengers #24 (2006)
X-Men #68 (1997)
Fantastic Four 2099 #6-8 (1996)

References

External links
Pasqual Ferry's work on Marvel.com
 Pasqual Ferry in 'Guia del comic' profile/bibliography about the artist 
Article in 'Tebeosfera' profile/full bibliography/commentary of his early works  
 http://www.comicbookdb.com/issue.php?ID=87895
 http://www.comicbookresources.com/forums/member.php?u=26739
 twitter.com/pasqualferry
 http://ferrypoli.blogspot.com/

Interviews

News item announcing Ferry on UFF with artwork, Newsarama
Comic Book Biography: Pasqual Ferry, Newsarama

Year of birth missing (living people)
Place of birth missing (living people)
Living people
Spanish comics artists
Spanish cartoonists